Toko Lay (in English store Lay) is a building in the center of Dili, East Timor. Built in 1959, during the Portuguese colonial era, it served as a refuge during the Indonesian invasion of East Timor in 1975. The building was also damaged during the violence of September 1999.

The building was historically a store owned by the Lay family, a Timorese family of Chinese descent. It is located on Rua 25 de Abril, in Colmera suco.

Indonesian invasion of Timor 

From August 1975 to December 1975, as political instability grew in Timor, many people left their homes and took refuge in the bigger buildings of Dili, such as Toko Lay.

On the morning of December 7, 1975, around 20 people of Chinese ethnicity were in the building as the Indonesian army invaded Dili. When Indonesian soldiers ordered the occupants to leave the building, Tsam Yi Tin, who was in the building next door, came out and was shot dead. His son was also shot but survived.

After the occupants came out of the building, they were taken to the waterfront, where soldiers pretended to kill them by cocking their guns. Eventually, women and children were released and were told to go to the Chinese school. In the next few days, men were ordered to dig several graves for Indonesian and East Timorese victims, some of whom they knew.

In 2012, a mass grave containing the bodies of 72 people, likely of Chinese ethnicity, was found at the national government palace, just near the Toko Lay building. It's unclear whether the grave dates to World War II or to the Indonesian invasion of 1975.

References

Buildings and structures in Dili
East Timor

Ethnic groups in East Timor
 
History of East Timor